Mivaleh-ye Olya  is a village in Asemanabad Rural District, in the Central District of Chardavol County, Ilam Province, Iran. At the 2001 census, its population was 152, in 29 families. The village is populated by Kurds.

References 

Populated places in Chardavol County
Kurdish settlements in Ilam Province